Artur Rashidovich Karpov (born 31 July 2001) is a Russian football player who plays for FC Kaluga on loan from FC Volgar Astrakhan.

Club career
He made his debut in the Russian Football National League for FC Volgar Astrakhan on 21 August 2021 in a game against FC Torpedo Moscow.

References

External links
 
 
 Profile by Russian Football National League

2001 births
Sportspeople from Astrakhan
Living people
Russian footballers
Association football midfielders
FC Volgar Astrakhan players
Russian Second League players
Russian First League players